James William Gitsham (12 May 1942 – 19 January 2005) was an English football left back who played in the Football League for Brentford.

Playing career 
Gitsham began his career in the youth team at Third Division club Brentford and turned professional in July 1959. At age 18, while still a part-time player, Gitsham made his professional debut in a 2–2 draw with Hull City at Griffin Park on 8 April 1961. He went on to establish himself in the left back position, but lost his place in the team to Tom Anthony in September 1962. Gitsham made 61 appearances before departing the Bees in the summer of 1963. He later played non-league football for Romford and Stevenage Town and was forced to retire due to a broken ankle.

Honours 
Brentford
 Football League Fourth Division: 1962–63

Career statistics

References

1942 births
2005 deaths
Footballers from Hammersmith
English footballers
Brentford F.C. players
English Football League players
Romford F.C. players
Stevenage Town F.C. players
Southern Football League players
Association football fullbacks